Shani Hazan (born ) is an Israeli model, singer, and a beauty pageant titleholder. She was crowned Miss Israel 2012, and subsequently competed in the Miss World 2012 pageant representing her homeland. She also represented Israel at Miss International 2014. Thus, Hazan is the only Miss Israel who represented her country in two worldwide beauty pageants.

Hazan was born in Israel, and raised in the city of Kiryat Ata, to a family of Sephardic Jewish (Moroccan-Jewish) descent.

She was a 19-year-old soldier serving in the Israeli Navy of the Israel Defense Forces, when she participated in the contest earning her the Miss Israel title.

References

1992 births
Living people
Miss International 2014 delegates
Miss Israel winners
People from Kiryat Ata
Miss World 2012 delegates
Israeli Sephardi Jews
Israeli people of Moroccan-Jewish descent
Israeli Mizrahi Jews
The X Factor contestants